Caylee Anna Hammack (born March 19, 1994) is an American country music singer-songwriter. She is signed to Capitol Records Nashville and released her debut album If It Wasn't for You on August 14, 2020. She is signed to Red Light Management and is managed by Mary Hilliard Harrington.

Early life
Hammack started playing music at age 13. While not getting much of a music education or vocal lessons at a young age, she self-taught by listening and singing songs on the country radio. The first time she had to turn down potential tennis scholarships was at age 15, after a surgery to remove a tumor. She wrote her first song, "Addictive", about the pain pills she had to take after the surgery.

While her brother played Southern rock and her sister Britney Spears songs, she discovered the country genre for herself and counts Dixie Chicks and the SHeDAISY as her early inspirations.

She received a full music scholarship to Belmont University in Nashville at age 18, but declined because her boyfriend persuaded her to stay in Ellaville with him. After she broke up with her boyfriend and was noticed by Luke Bryan, she moved to Nashville at the end of 2013 with about $1,000 of savings, a high school diploma, and her clothes in trash bags. She ran out of money and slept in her car. With a fake ID, she entered the music venues and bars and, after asking a bass player at the Honky Tonk Central on Broadway, she started to sing cover versions there weekly. Before signing a recording contract, she performed several original songs, including "Redhead".

Career
After about two years of playing and writing songs, she was introduced to Universal Music Publishing Group by Robert Filhart, where she started as a staff writer. During a writers' retreat, she found out that her house in Nashville had burned down due to an electrical fire that destroyed about 70% of her belongings. Tenille Townes was at the retreat with her and helped her during this time which was the start of their friendship.

In 2018, she signed a recording contract with Capitol Nashville.

Her debut song "Family Tree" was released on January 18, 2019, and was the most-added debut song by a female artist at country radio in the previous three years. On May 29, 2019 she performed the song on the Today show in her national television debut.

In 2019, she was the opening act for Lanco, Dierks Bentley, Trisha Yearwood, and Miranda Lambert.

Hammack wrote "Small Town Hypocrite" while still being a staff writer, together with Jared Scott, about the breakup with her boyfriend who cheated on her, which eventually brought her to Nashville. Later she found out that he lived in a double-wide trailer, which made its way into the song's final verse. The song was released on February 21, 2020. She sent a recording to Chris Stapleton, who agreed to sing vocals on the song.

In February 2020, Hammack learned about her first-ever ACM nomination for New Female Artist of the Year for the 2020 ACM Awards while waiting for a plane at the airport.

Hammack was scheduled as the opening act for Reba McEntire and Luke Bryan in 2020 but the tour was shortened due to the COVID-19 pandemic. The opening acts for McEntire were postponed, which left Hammack and her band with no income. During this time they offerred a landscaping service to make up for the lost income.

Hammack hosted a Facebook event together with Ashley McBryde called CMT Next Women of Country Goes Live on April 7, 2020 and appeared on Country Outdoors LIVE special from Outdoor Channel on May 8.

Her debut album If It Wasn’t For You was be released in August and contains 13 songs. She co-wrote 12 of them and wrote one by herself. The album features duets with Reba McEntire, Ashley McBryde, and Tenille Townes.

On August 13 a new version of "On the Road Again" with Willie Nelson, Hammack, and nine other Academy of Country Music nominees was published as "On the Road Again (ACM Lifting Lives Edition)" with proceeds from downloads to benefit a COVID-19 fund from ACM.

Influences
Hammack cites Kacey Musgraves, David Bowie, Tom Waits as her influences in her adult life.

Personal life
In November 2020, Hammack purchased a home in Nashville that needed to be renovated.

Awards and reception
 Hammack was named a "new country artist you need to know" by Rolling Stone in 2018. 

 Hammack was featured as an emerging country artist by Billboard in 2019.

 Hammack was recognized by CMT Listen Up on its 2020 list, which was extended into 2021 in August.

Discography

Albums

Singles

Other charted songs

Music videos

Awards and nominations

References

1994 births
21st-century American singers
21st-century American women singers
American country singer-songwriters
American women country singers
Capitol Records artists
Country musicians from Georgia (U.S. state)
Living people
People from Schley County, Georgia
Singer-songwriters from Georgia (U.S. state)